Cheng Jiasui (1565-1643) was a Chinese landscape painter and poet during the Ming Dynasty (1368–1644).

Cheng was born in Xiuning in the Anhui province and lived in Jiading. His style name was 'Mengyang' and his pseudonyms were 'Songyuan' and 'Ji'an'. Cheng's landscape painting followed the style of Huang Gongwang and Ni Zan in its wild and natural taste. Cheng also wrote a number of poems. Along with Tang Shisheng, Lou Jian, and Li Liufang, he was known as one of the "Four Teachers of Jiading".

Notes

References
 
 Ci hai bian ji wei yuan hui. Ci hai. Shanghai: Shanghai ci shu chu ban she, 1979.
 

1565 births
1643 deaths
Ming dynasty landscape painters
Ming dynasty poets
People from Huangshan
Artists from Anhui
Poets from Anhui